Kristian Pilipović (born 10 December 1994) is a Croatian handball player for Kadetten Schaffhausen and the Croatian national team. 

In the past he used to represent Austria. 

He participated at the 2018 European Men's Handball Championship.

References

1994 births
Living people
Sportspeople from Đakovo
Austrian male handball players
Croatian male handball players
Expatriate handball players
Croatian emigrants to Austria
Wisła Płock (handball) players